CBGA may refer to:

 ceramic ball grid array
 Canadian Beef Grading Agency
 CBGA-FM, a radio station (102.1 FM) licensed to Matane, Quebec, Canada
 central bank gold agreement
 cannabigerolic acid